The Costa Rican Tourism Board is the government agency responsible for promoting sustainable in Costa Rica. Originally the agency was created by decree in 1931 as the National Tourism Board, and by a law approved on 9 August 1955, the agency became the Instituto Costarricense de Turismo (ICT).

The Tourism Board is responsible for granting the fiscal incentives available in the country since 1985 for tourism development. These incentives consist mainly of tax exemptions for companies providing hotel services, air transport, car rental, gastronomy services, travel agencies, and other tourism related services.

The agency introduced in 1997 a voluntary Certification for Sustainable Tourism Program (known as CST) was introduced in order to turn "the concept of sustainability into something real" by "improving the way in which the natural and social resources are utilized, to motivate the active participation of the local communities, and to support the competitiveness of the business sector. The program was aimed for all types of businesses in the tourism industry, but it began only with lodging providers. By 2007, a total of 108 parameters are considered for the CST evaluation.

See also
Economy of Costa Rica
Tourism in Costa Rica

References

External links

Visit Costa Rica - Costa Rica Tourism

Institutions of Costa Rica
Tourism agencies
Tourism in Costa Rica